Flesh Feast is a 3D action horror game released on May 20, 1998 by SegaSoft. Flesh Feast was designed primarily for multiplayer gameplay on SegaSoft's Heat.net network.

Gameplay
Flesh Feast is a third-person action game with the in-game camera showing a top-down perspective in most instances. The game's plot concerns a secret ingredient invented by the food company Nutrition Applied Science and Technology Inc. (NASAT), which has been released and has infected the entire island's water supply. The citizens are dying and rising as flesh-hungry zombies, buried dead, break through the ground to attack the living. The player proceeds through fourteen levels controlling three teams of characters, each team consisting of one main character and two sub-characters. Throughout play, hordes of zombies attack the player and must be repelled with weapons which are found throughout levels. A radar display shows the location of items relative to the characters. The objective is to unlock the final showdown at NASAT headquarters by completing each of the game's levels, containing the disaster.

Each level is split into three sectors representing difficulty levels, with one of the player's teams of characters assigned to each. Completing sectors in order is not required. Levels take place over several locales such as a dock, a graveyard and a shopping mall. Characters are controlled directly or indirectly; players can manoeuvre their characters via the keyboard or click the mouse on enemies or items to command their teams to attack or collect items. Completing each sector involves locating the exit; typically this also entails obtaining keycards and other items to remove barriers.

Multiplayer games can be played via a local area network and online via the heat.net service. Both cooperative and competitive game modes are available for two to eight players.

Reception

The game received unfavorable reviews according to the review aggregation website GameRankings. Next Generation, however, said, "even though much of Flesh Feasts appeal comes from the bloodshed – imparted from 30 plus weapons ranging from human limbs to uzis – it's the puzzle-solving that keeps it interesting."

Notes

References

External links
Official Website (ARCHIVED)
Press Release on the release of Flesh Feast

1998 video games
North America-exclusive video games
Sega video games
Video games developed in Norway
Video games developed in the United Kingdom
Video games scored by Peter Connelly
Windows games
Windows-only games
Video games about zombies